Jadranka Barjaktarović (born 11 November 1981) is a Montenegrin singer. During 2020 and 2021, she had several controversial performances that were met with numerous condemnations and criticisms in Serbia, Republika Srpska and a part of the Montenegrin public.

Life and career 
She was born in the town of Berane where she grew up and completed primary and secondary education.

In 2005 she took third place in the second season of the music competition Zvezde Granda.

Two years later, she won the first prize at the festival in Cetinje with the song "Tvoja noć i moja zora" (Your night and my dawn).

In 2009 her label Grand Production was released Jadranka's first album entitled "Krv sam tvoja" (I am your blood). On the mentioned album, in addition to six songs, there were also the songs "Laka" (Easy) and "Neotporna" (Irresistible), but also the song "Tvoja noć i moja zora". The song "Laka" was singled out, a single from 2005 that stood out and is considered one of her best songs.

Controversies and political view 
In September 2020, Barjaktarović came to the public's attention after she sang a song by the Serbian singer Mitar Mirić at a performance in Podgorica, "Ne može nam niko ništa" (Nobody can do anything to us), with a reworked text "Ne može nam niko ništa, jači smo od Srbije" (Nobody can do anything to us, we are stronger than Serbia). After the performance, a large number of singers and media from Montenegro and Serbia condemned her performance, believing that it was hate speech.

As a result of her expression of hatred towards country and people in which she created, almost all performances in Serbia and Republika Srpska began to be canceled.

In February 2021, before the local elections in Nikšić, she recorded a video for the song "Crna Gora je moj dom" (Montenegro is my home) about Montenegrin nationalism in support of the Milo Đukanović's Democratic Party of Socialists. The video on YouTube has removed the likes and dislikes, and comments have been banned. This came at a time when polls showed that pro-Serbian coalition For the Future of Montenegro will defeat DPS, which is in power in Nikšić. In the song, Barjaktarović sings about Nikšić and Trebjesa, although she comes from Berane.

In June 2021, she performed a song "Sude mi" by Miroslav Škoro and Marko Perković Thompson which glorifies Croatian war general Ante Gotovina. Serbian public saw this as a provocation.

Discography

Albums 
 Krv sam tvoja (2009)

Singles 
 Lude godine (2011)
 Boli me (2011)
 Dupla s čemerom (2012)
 Fatalna (duet with Sha) (2012)
 Prsten (2013)
 Deja vu (2013)
 Mambo (2014)
 Vrijeme da se volimo (2014)
 Biser Crne Gore (2014)
 Očajna (2015)
 Idemo na more (duet with Rubini) (2015)
 Kad ljubav zaplače (2016)
 Zbog tebe (duet with Bane Ivić) (2016)
 Luzeru (2017)
 Pile moje (duet with Dijamanti bend) (2018)
 Urgentni centar (2018)
 Crna Gora je moj dom (2021)

Festivals 
 2007. Festival Cetinje - Tvoja noć i moja zora - first prize
 2008. Grand festival - Kad tela su vrela
 2010. Grand festival - Moj živote, moja tugo
 2012. Grand festival - Dupla s čemerom
 2014. Grand festival - Linija nadanja
 2015. Pink music fest - Očajna

References

External links

1981 births
Living people
People from Berane
21st-century Montenegrin women singers
Grand Production artists
Montenegrin folk singers